Stathis is a Greek name.
 Stathis Giallelis (born 21 January 1941) Greek actor 
 Stathis Psaltis (1948-2017), Greek actor
 Stathis K. Zachos (Στάθης (Ευστάθιος) Ζάχος born 1947, Athens) mathematician, logician and theoretical computer scientist 
 Stathis Chaitas (Στάθης Xάιτας born 20 March 1940) football midfielder during the 1960s and 1970s
 Stathis Damianakos (Στάθης Δαμιανάκος 1939 – 2003) researcher in the fields of agriculture 
 Stathis Karamalikis (born 4 December 1981 in Zakynthos, Greece) professional football striker
 Giannis Stathis (born 20 May 1987) Greek professional footballer
 Efstathios Tavlaridis, commonly known as Stathis Tavlaridis, Greek football defender
 Stathis Kappos (born 1979), Greek-Canadian footballer
 Stathis Borans, character from the 1986 film The Fly
 Stathis Provatidis  (Στάθης Προβατίδης; born 2 December 1982), Greek footballer playing for Diagoras F.C.

Greek masculine given names
Greek-language surnames
Surnames